Arie Verveen (born 28 September 1966) is an Irish actor. He has received an Independent Spirit Award Nomination (1997)and two Satellite Awards from the International Press Academy for his roles in the feature films Caught and The Thin Red Line.

Biography
Verveen studied under acting coach David G. Bennett in London, where he made his stage debut in a production of A Hatful Of Rain by Michael V. Gazzo, which he co-produced and starred in.
His appearance in Caught (1996) was his first lead role in a feature film, opposite Edward James Olmos and María Conchita Alonso, directed by Robert M. Young. This role garnered him a 1997 Special Achievement Satellite Award for Outstanding New Talent, an Independent Spirit Award nomination for Best Debut Performance, and critical acclaim for his work.

In 2010, Verveen appeared in season three of Sons of Anarchy as Liam O'Neill, a corrupt member of the Belfast charter of the Sons of Anarchy Motorcycle Club.
Verveen has also worked with directors such as Terrence Malick (The Thin Red Line), Robert Rodriguez and Frank Miller (Sin City), Guy Ritchie (Suspect), Eli Roth (Cabin Fever), Sergei Bodrov (Running Free).

Filmography

Film

Television

Awards
 Satellite Award for Best New Talent 1997

References

External links
 Official website

Living people
1966 births
Irish male film actors